Avner Faingulernt is an Israeli independent filmmaker. He is Associate Professor and the dean of the Faculty of Arts, Kibbutzim College in Tel Aviv. He was chair of the School of Audio & Visual Arts, Sapir Academic College, founder of Cinema South Festival in Sderot, chief editor of the annual "Cinema South Notebooks" and "Cinema South The Curator Book". Faingulernt was also a visiting professor at Columbia University in New York, the University of Haifa, the Film and TV School of the Academy of Performing Arts in Prague and at Filmakademie Baden Württemberg. He is an educator and a peace activist.

Life
Avner Faingulernt was born in Kibbutz Bror Hayil, as most residents are, to Brazilian immigrants. His parents came from Rio de Janeiro in 1955. He studied in Sha'ar HaNegev Regional Council high school and worked at the agricultural fields.

Like many other Kibbutz youth Faingulernt chose to do a service year as a regional coordinator in Sha'ar HaNegev Regional Council and in Sderot. In 1981 he was recruited to the Israeli Defense Forces to the commando squad of Sayeret Matkal special ops unit. After his service he wandered for five years in Israel and all over the world. Among other occupations he worked as a Truck Driver of lighting and camera gear on movie sets and as a fisherman in New York City. According to him, his exposure to film making and especially his job as a lighting best boy filled him with great love towards cinema, and especially for Documentary film making. In 1990 he began his studies of Cinema and Psychology in the Tel Aviv University, where he also directed his first movies.

In 1992, at the time of birth of his first daughter, he returned to the Kibbutz where he was born and raised and dedicated himself to renew the local education system, an important component in the effort to draw back population to Bror Hayil. Afterwards he worked as a director of documentaries items for the show "Ha'She'elah Ha'ba'ah" on Keshet Broadcasting, produced by Yaron London and Nurit Kedar. In 1997, he directed and produced his first documentary film, along with Maya Bar, The First Will Be the Last.

The following stage in his life was to return living and working in the south of Israel creating his unique cinematic language. In 1999 he established an independent studio for documentary and experimental film making in Bror Hayil, and worked then in collaboration with Macabit Abramson and Lev Goltzer on his following films. He was among the founders of the School of Audio & Visual Arts in Sapir Academic College and had been the chair of the school from 2001 to 2018. He initiated and founded the Cinema South Festival in Sderot, the Cinema South Notebooks and the Cinema South The Curator Book, which are journals that offer a stage for articles and discussions regarding films. He completed his PhD studies in London.

Faingulernt is a father of four.

Academic career
Faingulernt has a Bachelor's degree in Film & TV department and Psychology department at Tel Aviv University, 1993. In 1999, he was one of the people who initiated the Film Department with Professor Haim Bresheet at Sapir Academic College. They opened the film school and Faingulernt became the chair in the end of 2001.

Between the years 2005 and 2009 he studied for a Master's degree and a Doctor of Philosophy degree in the University of East London in England. The subject of his doctorate was: The Fathers Return in the Modern European Cinematic Odysseys.

In 2011, upon the opening of Master's degree program in the University of Haifa, Faingulernt was recruited as a part of its academic faculty. In 2012 he was a visiting professor at Columbia University in New York City. He also taught a practical workshop of "Desert and Journey", a collaboration between the Film and TV School of the Academy of Performing Arts in Prague and Sapir Academic College's master's degree program.

In 2014, Faingulernt founded, alongside Prof. Judd Ne'eman, the master's degree program of the School of Audio & Visual arts at Sapir Academic College. He was the head of the program until 2018.

In 2017-2018 Faingulernt had been appointed as visiting professor at Filmakademie Baden Württemberg, ludwigsburg.

Since 2019, Faingulernt is the dean of Faculty of Arts at Kibbutzim college in Neve Tzedek, Tel aviv. He is leading an integration of arts, developing the faculty in community-based and experimental paths.

Faingulernt is a member of Israel Directors' and Screenwriters' Union and Documentary Film Makers Forum. He was co-chair of this Forum in 2019–2020.

Political activity
During the Operation Pillar of Defense in the Gaza Strip there was a consensus among residents of the Negev the supported the wide military operations, and the majority of them even demanded its expansion. Faingulernt was among the few of the area's residents who objected to that consensus. He published his stands against the military operation on different web forums and online media.

Filmography and exhibitions

Films

Exhibitions

Matador of War cinematic installation (2010) - A cinematic installation at Petach Tikva Museum of Art unfolding a journey along the Gaza-Israel border during Operation Cast Lead, the travelogue sketches an intimate portrait of a vulnerable border area, striving to introduce a profile of Israel in a time of crisis. Parts of the film are projected in three different screens that divide the creation like in a bullfight ring where the audience observes the rising smoke over Gaza. -  Producer, Director, Script Writer and Cinematographer.

The Diary of a Brazilian (2013)) - A one-man-show, on stage and screen together, that tell the journey of searching for identity and the meaning of being a filmmaker, following the death of his father. His Israeli-Zionist-Kibbutz world has become one and he journeys towards the exile from which his parents and grandparents flee. In his journey he wanders between small Jewish towns in West Ukraine, Odessa, Rio de Janeiro and São Paulo in Brazil until Bror Hayil, the Kibbutz in which he was born and raised. A journey that takes place both in real life and in abstract memory, controlled by fantasy and ghost meetings from the past and from the Jewish exile of Eastern Europe and Brazil. During the journey has asks to penetrate deep into the depth of the complicated relationships between his father, his grandfather and his son and their path to his own soul. The show was performed in The Monodrama Festival in the Gerard Behar Center in Jerusalem as part of the Israel Festival, in Cinema South Festival in 2013 and in the Israel Society Convention in Sderot 2013. At the end of the convention a discussion was held between Faingulernt, PhD Amnon Raz-Krakotzkin and the members of the audience.

Associate producer

 Sisai (2005), Directed by David Gavro.
 Summer Seeds (2006), Directed by Chen Lesker.
 In Freiman's Kitchen (2007), Directed by Hadar Bashan.
 Red Dawn (2007), a series of films made by the school for the arts of sound and screen, edited by Boris Maftzir.
 Gaza, Sderot - Life in Spite of Everything (2008), A website produced by Osnat Trabelsi and Arik Benstein.
 Hula and Natan (2010), Directed by Roby Elmaliach.

References

External links
 Avner Faingulernt at IMDb
https://skeneborder.com/ - The production company of Avner Faingulernt and Hagar Saad-Shalom.
Faingulernt's page in the Sapir Academic College website (Hebrew).
 South Curatorship - A yearly cinema journal published in the Sapir Academic College website (Hebrew).
 Article on "Men on the Edge - A Fishermen's Diary" in "What Cinema Can Do" website (English).
 "Draw Me Black Angles" - Faningulernt offers a new reading on the film "Journal" as a journey in the footsteps of the mother (Hebrew).
 Interview in "Takriv" (English).
The Hearts of Fishers about Men on the Edge - Fishermen's Diary.
Israel: The wounds of a destiny, Aude Marcovitch (French)
Radio Télévision Suisse interviewing Faingulernt (French). 
Sderot, Last Exit by Osvalde Lewat (review)
An interview in Cinespect (English).
Dana Herman "The Man Down South Who Never Stops Shooting", from "Ha'Aretz" website (English).
Jessica Steinberg Sderot’s film festival is a ‘beit midrash’ for movies.
Roger Koza interviewing Faingulernt, part 1, part 2
Modern Times Review, Parallel lives at the West Bank, Hans Henrik Fafner
Hana Nováková In the Desert: Dreaming with the diptych of Avner Faingulernt
i24 news Interview with Faingulernt

Israeli filmmakers
Israeli activists
Columbia University faculty
Academic staff of the University of Haifa
Jewish peace activists
Academic staff of Sapir Academic College
Living people
1961 births